Cortil-Wodon is a village of Wallonia and a district of the municipality of Fernelmont, located in the province of Namur, Belgium.

It was formerly a municipality itself until the fusion of Belgian municipalities in 1977.

It was the site of every edition of the annual Rhâââ Lovely Festival, from 2000 until 2008 inclusive.

Former municipalities of Namur (province)